Niels Giffey (born 8 June 1991) is a German professional basketball player for Bayern Munich of the Basketball Bundesliga (BBL) and the EuroLeague. He also represents the Germany national team.

He played collegiately for the University of Connecticut Huskies men's basketball team. In his freshman year, he was part of the team that won the 2011 NCAA Men's Division I Basketball Tournament. He was again one of UConn's key players when they won the NCAA tournament for a second time in four years in 2014. Giffey and his UConn teammates Shabazz Napier and Tyler Olander are the only Division I men's basketball players in history to have won national championships as freshmen and seniors.

Early life
Giffey was born on 9 June 1991 in Berlin. He is the son of Frank and Christine Giffey. He attended Heinrich-Schliemann-Oberschule gymnasium and competed for the club team Alba Berlin.

College career
Giffey committed to play basketball at the University of Connecticut under coach Jim Calhoun. As a freshman, he was a reserve on the squad which won the 2011 NCAA Men's Division I Basketball Tournament. After winning the tournament, he said, “It was such an emotional time for me, that this university, this team, became such a big part of my heart and became so close to me that it never crossed my mind to leave this place. I always felt it was about being a student-athlete at UConn. This school gave me so much when I won my national championship with this team.” Giffey scored four points and grabbed six rebounds in the championship game against Butler. On the season, he averaged 2.2 points and 1.4 rebounds in 9.9 minutes per game.

As a sophomore, Giffey averaged 2.6 points and 1.5 rebounds per game. He missed the first game of the season after hyper extending his elbow in the preseason.

As a junior, he averaged 4.9 points and 3.6 rebounds per game. He injured his knee in a game against Cincinnati on 3 March 2013 and missed the remainder of the season.

In the semifinal game of the 2014 American Athletic Conference men's basketball tournament Giffey scored a career-high 24 points, including six three-pointers, to help Connecticut defeat Memphis 72–53 on 14 March 2014.

Professional career
Following graduation, Giffey played on the 2014 Memphis Grizzlies summer league team and then the Utah Jazz summer league team. On 15 July 2014, the German team Alba Berlin announced that they had signed him for three seasons.

On 29 July 2019, Giffey extended his contract with Alba for two more seasons, until 2022. Serving as the Berlin team captain, Giffey won the German national championship as well as the German Cup competition in 2020. During the 2020–21 season, he averaged 8 points and 2.8 rebounds per game.

On 18 June 2021, Giffey signed with Žalgiris Kaunas of the Lithuanian Basketball League (LKL). On 17 June 2022, he parted ways with the club.

On 11 October 2022, Giffey signed a short-term deal with UCAM Murcia of the Liga ACB.

On 8 November 2022, Giffey signed with Bayern Munich of the Basketball Bundesliga (BBL) until the end of the 2024–2025 season.

Honours and titles

Team
Alba Berlin
2x Basketball Bundesliga: 2019–20, 2020–21
2× BBL-Pokal: 2016, 2020
 German Supercup: 2014
UCONN
 2× NCAA champion: 2011, 2014

Career statistics

EuroLeague

|-
| style="text-align:left;"| 2014–15
| style="text-align:left;" rowspan=3| Alba Berlin
| 24 || 15 || 15.2 || .443 || .396 || .400 || 2.3 || .2 || .5 || .1 || 4.9 || 2.6
|-
| style="text-align:left;"| 2019–20
| 28 || 8 || 18.8 || .486 || .478 || .851 || 2.2 || 1.2 || .8 || .3 || 8.8 || 7.6
|-
| style="text-align:left;"| 2020–21
| 24 || 5 || 20.0 || .487 || .418 || .792 || 2.9 || 1.4 || .8 || .4 || 8.1 || 8.3
|-
| style="text-align:left;"| 2021–22
| style="text-align:left;"| Žalgiris Kaunas
| 28 || 5 || 16.3 || .430 || .345 || .882 || 2.7 || .8 || .6 || .1 || 5.6 || 5.1
|- class="sortbottom"
| colspan=2 style="text-align:center;"| Career
| 104 || 33 || 17.6|| .466 || .412 || .809 || 2.5 || .9 || .7 || .2 || 6.9 || 5.9

References

External links

 Niels Giffey at draftexpress.com
 Niels Giffey at eurobasket.com
 Niels Giffey at euroleague.net (archive)
Niels Gifey at euroleaguebasketball.net
Niels Gifey at realgm.com

1991 births
Living people
2019 FIBA Basketball World Cup players
Alba Berlin players
Basketball players at the 2020 Summer Olympics
Basketball players from Berlin
BC Žalgiris players
FC Bayern Munich basketball players
German expatriate basketball people in Lithuania
German expatriate basketball people in the United States
German men's basketball players
Olympic basketball players of Germany
Small forwards
UConn Huskies men's basketball players